Kerry Zavagnin (born July 2, 1974 in Plymouth, Michigan) is an American former soccer midfielder, who last played defensive midfielder for the Kansas City Wizards of Major League Soccer, and sparingly for the US national team. Kerry Zavaginin also went to and played soccer for Detroit Catholic Central High School. He is currently an assistant coach with Sporting Kansas City.

Zavagnin played his college soccer at the University of North Carolina at Chapel Hill from 1992 to 1995, where he registered 22 goals and 24 assists in 76 games. Upon graduating, Zavagnin joined the Raleigh Flyers of the USISL, one of the two major outdoor second divisions in US soccer, for their 1996 season.

Professional career
After one year with the Flyers, Zavagnin was drafted 21st overall with the first pick of the third round in the 1997 MLS Supplemental Draft by the Colorado Rapids.  Before playing a single game for the Rapids, however, Kerry was traded to the New York/New Jersey MetroStars, in exchange for Peter Vermes.  Zavagnin played 1743 minutes for the Metros in 1997 and 1998, and did not acquit himself well, playing himself out of MLS.  In 1997, the MetroStars sent him on loan to the Long Island Rough Riders of the USISL.

Zavagnin joined the Lehigh Valley Steam of the A-League for the 1999 season.   After one season in the A-League, Zavagnin returned to MLS after being drafted 30th overall in the 2000 MLS SuperDraft by the Kansas City Wizards.  Zavagnin quickly established himself with the Wizards, playing 2743 minutes at midfield for a team that would both go on to win the MLS Cup, and was one of the best defensive teams in the league's history.  Zavagnin remained an important contributor to the Wizards for the next six years, playing a quiet defensive role, and establishing himself as one of the better, though also one of the least recognized, midfielders in the league.

In 2004, Zavagnin began to be recognized among the league's elite. He won a lot of praise for running the Wizards midfield, and was named to the MLS Best XI. In eight years in the league, Zavagnin scored five goals and added 20 assists in regular season play.

Zavagnin received 21 caps for the U.S. national team, making his debut October 25, 2000 against US arch-rival Mexico.

In August, 2008, Zavagnin announced that he would retire at the end of the season.

Career statistics

As of July 25

Honors
Kansas City Wizards
MLS Cup: 2000
Supporters' Shield: 2000
U.S. Open Cup: 2004

Individual
MLS Best XI: 2004
Major League Soccer All-Star Game: 2004
Sporting Legend: Class of 2016

References

External links
 Kerry Zavagnin profile on US National Soccer Players Association
 
 Zavagnin calls it a career in the MLS

1974 births
People from Plymouth, Michigan
Living people
American soccer players
Soccer players from Michigan
Sporting Kansas City players
Lehigh Valley Steam players
Long Island Rough Riders players
Major League Soccer players
New York Red Bulls players
North Carolina Tar Heels men's soccer players
Raleigh Flyers players
United States men's international soccer players
USISL Select League players
Major League Soccer All-Stars
United States men's under-20 international soccer players
Colorado Rapids draft picks
Sporting Kansas City draft picks
A-League (1995–2004) players
Sporting Kansas City non-playing staff
Association football midfielders
Detroit Catholic Central High School alumni